Albertville is a suburb of Johannesburg, South Africa. It is located in Region 4.

History
The suburb is named after the previous landowner Hendrick Abraham Alberts with the land being surveyed in 1896. The land is situated on a portion of an old Witwatersrand farm called Waterval.

References

Johannesburg Region B